H. madagascariensis  may refer to:
 Harungana madagascariensis, the haronga, a flowering plant species found in tropical Africa (including Madagascar) and Mauritius
 Heterixalus madagascariensis, a frog species endemic to Madagascar
 Hickelia madagascariensis, a bamboo species found in Madagascar
 Hippopotamus madagascariensis, the Malagasy hippopotamus or Malagasy dwarf or pygmy hippopotamus, an  extinct mammal species that lived on the island of Madagascar
 Hypsipetes madagascariensis, the Madagascar bulbul, a songbird species found on the Comoros, Madagascar, Mayotte and the Seychelles

See also